Luzhu District is a district in Taoyuan City, Taiwan, home to 165,914 people.

The downtown district, known as Nankan, is now a high density, high-rise suburb for many who work in Taipei and Taoyuan City. The first opened shopping center in Taiwan, Taimall, located in Nankan, is a weekend destination for many Taoyuan regional residents.

History
Luzhu was upgraded to a county-administered city from the former rural township of Taoyuan County on 3 June 2014. On 25 December 2014, it was upgraded again to a district named Luzhu District of Taoyuan City.

Geography
 Area: 
 Population: 167,654 (February 2023)

Administrative divisions

The district is administered as 37 villages: Dazhu, Fuchang, Fulu, Fuxing, Fuzhu, Haihu, Hongzhu, Jinxing, Jinzhong, Jixiang, Kengkou, Kengzi, Luxing, Luzhu, Nankan, Nanrong, Nanxing, Neicuo, Shanbi, Shangxing, Shangzhu, Shanjiao, Shunxing, Waishe, Wayao, Wufu, Xiangchou, Xingrong, Xinxing, Xinzhuang, Yingfu, Yingpan, Zhangshou, Zhangxing, Zhongfu, Zhongshan and Zhongxing.

Economy

EVA Air maintains its headquarters in Luzhu. The headquarters of Evergreen Marine Corporation is also in Luzhu.

Education

Universities and colleges
 Kainan University

High schools
 Taoyuan Municipal Nankan Senior High School

International schools
 Taoyuan American School

Transportation

Road
Luzhu is located at kilometer 49 of the Highway no. 1 (English highway signs: 'Nankan interchange' or 'Taoyuan interchange').

Taoyuan Airport MRT
 Kengkou Station
 Shanbi Station

See also

 Taoyuan City

References

External links
 
  

Districts of Taoyuan City